Chittaphon Leechaiyapornkul (born February 27, 1996), known professionally as Ten, is a Thai singer and dancer based in South Korea and China. He debuted with South Korean boy band NCT in 2016 as part of its first sub-unit, NCT U. Since 2019, he has been active mainly as a member of NCT's China-based unit WayV and the South Korean supergroup SuperM. Ten has also released several solo singles through the SM Station project: "Dream in a Dream" (2017), "New Heroes" (2018), "Paint Me Naked" (2021) and "Birthday" (2022).

Early life
Ten was born in Bangkok, Thailand, on February 27, 1996, to a Thai Chinese family. He studied at the Shrewsbury International School.

In January 2011, at the age of 15, Ten competed on the Thai show Teen Superstar, under the stage name TNT. He won and earned an opportunity to sign a contract with the South Korean agency Starship Entertainment, although his family did not allow him to go. He ultimately joined SM Entertainment in 2013 after passing an SM Global Audition in Thailand.

Career

2013–2015: Pre-debut activities

On December 24, 2013, Ten was introduced as a member of SM Rookies, a pre-debut team composed of trainees under SM Entertainment. In 2014, he and future groupmates appeared on the Mnet-produced Exo 90:2014, a show starring labelmates Exo, where they danced to K-pop songs from the '90s. He also participated in the music video remake of G.o.d's "To Mother". In July 2015, Ten and fellow trainee Jaehyun competed in the Hope Basketball All-Star with SM Town, a charity match held by Hope Basketball All-Star Organizing Committee.

2016–2018: Career beginnings and debut with NCT U 

On April 3, 2016, Ten was confirmed to debut alongside Jaehyun, Mark, Taeyong, and Doyoung as NCT U, the first sub-unit of SM Entertainment's then-upcoming boy group NCT. The rotational unit debuted with the digital single "The 7th Sense", released on April 8. It was the first release of NCT overall. Three months after his debut, Ten participated in Mnet's dance competition show Hit the Stage alongside other K-pop dancers such as Hyoyeon of Girls' Generation, Taemin of Shinee, Momo of Twice, among others. Teaming up with dance crew Prepix, he won the uniform challenge on the sixth episode. In January 2017, Ten joined the cast of SBS' program, Real Class: Elementary School Teacher, which showed foreign K-pop idols learning the Korean language from elementary students, hosted by Kang Ho-dong.

On April 7, 2017, Ten released his first solo digital single as part of SM The Performance and through season two of the SM Station project, titled "Dream in a Dream". He concluded the season with the single "New Heroes" on April 6, 2018, which he performed for the first time at the SM Town Live World Tour VI in Dubai that day. The songs peaked at number five and four on the Billboard World Digital Song Sales, respectively. "Dream in a Dream" was included in NCT's first studio album, NCT 2018 Empathy. For the album, Ten also participated in NCT U's single "Baby Don't Stop", a duet with Taeyong, and joined the rest of NCT 2018 members for the dance-focused single "Black On Black".

2019–2020: Debuts with WayV and SuperM 

On December 31, 2018, Ten was announced to join WayV, NCT's China-based unit managed by Label V, a subsidiary of SM Entertainment, alongside Kun, Winwin, Lucas, Hendery, Xiaojun, and Yangyang. The group debuted on January 17, 2019 with the digital extended play (EP) The Vision and Chinese version of NCT 127's "Regular" as its lead single.

On July 16, 2019, Food Truck Battle started its broadcast on Thailand channel PPTV with Ten as the MC. The show also had a week-late broadcast on the show's official YouTube channel. It featured both Thai and Korean celebrities such as Nam Tae-hyun, Park Ye-eun, Kitty Chica, and James Teeradon. In August, Ten was announced to join Taemin of Shinee, Baekhyun and Kai of EXO, Taeyong and Mark of NCT 127, and Lucas as a member of SuperM, a male K-pop supergroup created by SM Entertainment and Capitol Records with activities primarily aimed at the American market. The group released their self-titled debut EP on October 4, 2019, and became the first Asian artist to rank number one on the US Billboard 200 with a debut release. They subsequently toured North America, Latin America, and Europe from November 2019 to February 2020.

In September 2020, SM Entertainment announced that all units of NCT would unite to release a two-part second full album, NCT 2020 Resonance. In the first part, Ten participated in the B-side tracks "Faded In My Last Song" as a member of NCT U and "Nectar" with WayV. In the second part, Ten was the only member to participate in both title tracks, "90's Love" and "Work It".

2021–present: Sub-unit debut and solo activities 
On August 10, 2021, Ten released his third solo single under the SM Station project, titled "Paint Me Naked". On August 17, Ten debuted as part of WayV's second sub-unit named WayV-Ten & Yangyang with single titled "Low Low". On October 25, Ten appeared as a special judge for the wild card round of the fourth season of the dance competition show Street Dance of China. Ten later participated in the recording of NCT's third studio album Universe, released on December 14. He appeared on four songs: "OK!" and "Round&Round" as NCT U, as well as "Miracle" with WayV and "Beautiful" with NCT 2021.

On April 7, 2022, Ten was announced as one of the team leaders alongside  of Into1, Wang Feifei and Cheng Xiao for Youku's female-centric dance competition show Great Dance Crew, which premiered on April 16. Ten was slated to be back as the MC of Food Truck Battle Season 2. The show, which features Yangyang of WayV, Woodz, Janistar Phomphadungcheep, Prem Warut, and Boun Noppanut, started with a fan meeting at Royal Paragon Hall in September and was premiered on October 2 on Channel 8. On October 26, Ten released the R&B dance digital single "Birthday" as part of SM Station's sub-project, NCT Lab.

Other ventures
In June 2021, Ten launched a five-piece apparel collection featuring his original artworks titled "What is ??? The Answers" through the direct-to-fan retailer Represent.

Personal life
Ten is multilingual and speaks Thai, English, Korean and Mandarin. In 2018, Ten received an official exemption from Thailand's mandatory military service after failing to pass the physical exam due to his past injury and knee surgery.

Discography

As lead artist

As featured artist

Filmography

Television

Music videos

As lead artist

As featuring artist

Awards and nominations

Notes

References

External links

 Ten at SM Town

1996 births
Living people
Musicians from Bangkok
K-pop singers
SM Entertainment artists
SuperM members
SM Rookies members
21st-century Thai male singers
Thai pop singers
Korean-language singers of Thailand
Thai people of Chinese descent
Thai expatriates in South Korea
NCT (band) members